Anders Høyen Egholm (born May 15, 1983) is a Danish professional football defender, who plays for Varde IF as a player-assistant coach.

Career 
On 6 November 2009, the central defender, with a contract expiring within the end of November 2009 with Danish side of SønderjyskE, signed an agreement with Randers FC, starting from January 2010.

Egholm announced on 25 November 2018, that he would retire at the end of 2018, and would be leaving SønderjyskE. But Egholm was not done playing. He signed with lower Danish Series club Varde IF as a playing assistant coach.

References

External links
 Anders Egholm on DBU 
 

1983 births
Living people
Danish men's footballers
Denmark youth international footballers
Esbjerg fB players
Herfølge Boldklub players
SønderjyskE Fodbold players
Randers FC players
Hobro IK players
Vejle Boldklub players
Danish Superliga players
Association football defenders
People from Faxe Municipality
Sportspeople from Region Zealand